This is a list of heads of the Canton 10.

Heads of the Canton 10 (1996–present)

Governors

Prime Ministers

External links
World Statesmen - Canton 10

Canton 10